Dwayne "D. J." King (born June 27, 1984) is a Canadian former professional ice hockey left winger who played in the National Hockey League (NHL) with the St. Louis Blues and the Washington Capitals.

Playing career
He was drafted in the 6th round of the 2002 NHL Entry Draft, 191st overall, by the St. Louis Blues. As a junior from the Western Hockey League's, Lethbridge Hurricanes and Kelowna Rockets, King, known as an enforcer, spent his first two professional seasons within the Blues organization with affiliates in the American Hockey League and ECHL.

He made his NHL debut in the 2006–07 season on October 5, 2006 against the San Jose Sharks. King was then reassigned to play a majority of the year with AHL affiliate, the Peoria Rivermen. As first recall with the Blues and after being held scoreless in his first 24 NHL games, King scored his first career goal against Curtis Joseph in a 5–2 victory of the Phoenix Coyotes on April 4, 2007. He finished with 27 games for the Blues during the season, registering two points (one goal, one assist) along with 52 penalty minutes.

King's 2008–09 season was ruined by a season-ending shoulder injury, playing only one game for the Blues. He returned for the 2009–10 season, easily defeating Krys Barch in his first game of the season. However, King broke an already-damaged finger on his hand in the fight, sidelining him for several months. King's found himself bouncing back between the AHL and NHL throughout his career.

On July 28, 2010, King was re-signed to a two-year contract extension with the Blues in order to facilitate a trade to the Washington Capitals for Stefan Della Rovere.

A free agent during the 2012–13 season, King was signed to a contract with the minor league team, the Ontario Reign of the ECHL on February 20, 2013.

Throughout King's career he was a known fighter, through his junior hockey days up to the NHL. Some of his most notable fight came against Dion Phaneuf in the WHL, Colton Orr, and Derek Boogaard.

Personal life
King is of Métis heritage. His younger brother Dwight also plays professional hockey, currently playing for Avtomobilist Yekaterinburg of the Kontinental Hockey League (KHL). He and his long time girlfriend Chantal Babin have 2 boys together. In 2015, King, James Norman, and Jeremy Norman became owners of Tawaw Cabins, a resort located in Waterhen Lake, Saskatchewan.

Career statistics

References

External links

1984 births
Alaska Aces (ECHL) players
Canadian ice hockey left wingers
Canadian Métis people
Hershey Bears players
Sportspeople from Meadow Lake, Saskatchewan
Kelowna Rockets players
Lethbridge Hurricanes players
Living people
Métis sportspeople
Ontario Reign (ECHL) players
Peoria Rivermen (AHL) players
St. Louis Blues draft picks
St. Louis Blues players
Ice hockey people from Saskatchewan
Washington Capitals players
Worcester IceCats players